Berghausen is the name of several communes:

Berghausen, Austria, a municipality in Styria, Austria
Berghausen, Rhineland-Palatinate - a municipality in the Verbandsgemeinde Katzenelnbogen, district Rhein-Lahn, Germany
a borough of Königswinter, North Rhine-Westphalia
a part of the municipality Pfinztal
, a former village now part of the town Bad Berleburg, North Rhine-Westphalia, Germany
Berghausen (Römerberg), a district of Römerberg, Rhineland-Palatinate
Berghausen (Schmallenberg), a locality in the municipality Schmallenberg, district Hochsauerlandkreis, Germany